Bob de Klerk (born 1961) is a Dutch football manager and former player.

Playing career
De Klerk was born in Amsterdam. Having started his career with SC Telstar he played for K.S.V. Waregem in Belgium and De Graafschap in the Dutch Eredivise. He was forced into early retirement due to injury.

Coaching career
De Klerk lead the Ajax Saturday team to the Hoofdklasse.
He also worked with the Ajax A1 youth team alongside Frank de Boer and lead the team following de Boer's promotion to AFC Ajax manager.

In addition to his work at Ajax, de Klerk spent time with Ajax Cape Town in South Africa.

He spent nine years working in the Ajax youth system before moving to Major League Soccer. De Klerk joined Toronto FC on 6 January 2011 as First Assistant Coach along with former Ajax colleague Aron Winter who became Head Coach/Technical Director. On 14 May 2012 it was announced the de Klerk had been promoted to technical manager of Toronto with former player and academy coach Jim Brennan replacing him as assistant coach. It was announced on 7 January 2013 that de Klerk would not return to Toronto FC the following season.

In September 2013, after two months of managing Dutch Topklasse side Ter Leede he became technical director at Dalian Aerbin F.C. of the Chinese Super League. In November 2014, he was appointed the Technical Director for York Region Shooters of the Canadian Soccer League.

Bob was also the Technical Director for KNSC, Kleinburg Nobleton Soccer club. A small community based club in Vaughan Ontario, Canada. Just north of Toronto. www.KNSC.ca

References

External links
 Toronto FC profile

1961 births
Living people
Association football forwards
Association football wingers
Dutch footballers
K.S.V. Waregem players
De Graafschap players
Eredivisie players
Belgian Pro League players
Footballers from Amsterdam
Toronto FC non-playing staff
Atlanta United FC non-playing staff
SC Telstar players
Jong Ajax managers
Dutch expatriate sportspeople in Canada
Dutch expatriate sportspeople in the United States
Ter Leede managers
Dutch football managers